Raymond Richard "Andy" Guest Jr. (September 29, 1939 – April 2, 2001) was an American politician. A Republican, he served as a member of the Virginia House of Delegates from 1972 to 2000 and was minority leader in that chamber from 1985 to 1991. He was the son of state senator and United States Ambassador to Ireland Raymond R. Guest. He died of cancer at his home in Front Royal, Virginia on April 2, 2001. A state park in Warren County near his residence, Shenandoah River Raymond R. "Andy" Guest Jr. State Park, was named in his honor in 1995.

References

Further reading

External links
 
 

1939 births
2001 deaths
Republican Party members of the Virginia House of Delegates
Yale University alumni
20th-century American politicians
Andy
Politicians from New York City
People from Front Royal, Virginia